Lackawanna Terminal could refer to several former Delaware, Lackawanna and Western Railroad stations:
 Hoboken Terminal in Hoboken, New Jersey
 Lackawanna Terminal (Montclair, New Jersey) in Montclair, New Jersey
 Radisson Lackawanna Station Hotel in Scranton, Pennsylvania
 Lackawanna Terminal (Buffalo, New York) in Buffalo, New York